Lam Tsuen is an area in Tai Po District, Hong Kong, noted for its Lam Tsuen wishing trees. The nearby Lam Tsuen River, empties into Tai Po Hoi.

Villages
Lam Tsuen is not a village in the political sense but rather a union of the 23 villages scattered across the Lam Tsuen Valley along with five indigenous (Punti) villages and 18 Hakka villages.

Today, Lam Tsuen spreads over an area covering 26 villages:
 Pak Ngau Shek Sheung Tsuen
 Pak Ngau Shek Ha Tsuen
 Ng Tung Chai
 Chai Kek
 Tai Yeung Che
 Ma Po Mei
 Shui Wo
 Ping Long
 Tai Om Shan
 Siu Om Shan
 Tai Om
 Lung A Pai, a Hakka village
 Tin Liu Ha, a Hakka village, which was subdivided into 2 villages: Sheung Tin Liu Ha (Upper Tin Liu Ha) and Ha Tin Liu Ha (Lower Tin Liu Ha)
 San Tong
 San Tsuen
 She Shan Tsuen
 Tong Sheung Tsuen
 Chung Uk Tsuen, the oldest village in Lam Tsuen, was established more than 600 years ago.
 San Uk Tsai
 Fong Ma Po (lit. "place for grazing horses"), a Punti village, where the Tin Hau Temple and the Lam Tsuen wishing trees are located
 Hang Ha Po
 Kau Liu Ha
 Wai Tau Tsuen
 Nam Wa Po
 Lin Au Lei Uk
 Lin Au Cheng Uk

Name: although the union of villages is called Lam Tsuen, however, the majority of villagers has the surname: Chong, only a small proportion of residents are of surname Lam

Attractions

Wishing Tree 

Wishing Tree is two camphor trees which were seen as "god" by the inhabitant. Traditionally, the villagers used to burn the joss paper and light up the candle under the trees for making wishes. In the legend, a woman who fell in ill dreamed that a god told her to visit Lam Tsuen and throw a piece of joss paper to the great tree. She followed the instruction and the women recovered. Afterwards, the people changed to toss the joss paper to the trees with their blessings written on it.

Tin Hau Temple 
Tin Hau Temple at Lam Tsuen was built in 1768 to honour the Tin Hau, the goddess of the sea, who calmed the sea to protect the fishermen. In the beginning, the villagers had inadequate capital to construct the temple but a rich man, Tang, paid for the construction cost after he knew the situation. Then, the villagers put Tang's monument into the temple for worship.

The villagers see the temple as the most sacred place in their village and the Bun Festival is held in there in every nine years. The regular worship and ceremony are also held in the Tin Hau Temple in normal days.

Well-Wishing Festival 
Well-Wishing Festival was developed from traditional ritual for the inhabitant to the most representative ritual for making wishes in Hong Kong. The festival is held in the first couple of weeks of Chinese New Year. In the festival, the people can make wishes by tossing the joss paper, making lotus lanterns and doing other interesting activities. To attract more visitors, the Well-Wishing Carnival is developed and people can enjoy the cultural performance such as lion dance, and food stalls and game booths in the festival.

Da Jiu Festival 

In Da Jiu Festival, people pray for good weather, health and peace in their village. This festival is held in Lam Tsuen in every 10 years. It lasts for five days and six nights.

Education
Lam Tsuen is in Primary One Admission (POA) School Net 84. Within the school net are multiple aided schools (operated independently but funded with government money) and Tai Po Government Primary School (大埔官立小學).

See also
 List of villages in Hong Kong

References

External links

 "Review of Egretries in Hong Kong", in Hong Kong Biodiversity, Issue No. 14 March 2007, pp. 1-6.

 
Populated places in Hong Kong
Hakka culture in Hong Kong